Protosphaerion is a genus of beetles in the family Cerambycidae, containing the following species:

 Protosphaerion loreum Gounelle, 1909
 Protosphaerion pictum Martins, 2005
 Protosphaerion punctatum Martins, 2005
 Protosphaerion signatipenne Gounelle, 1909
 Protosphaerion variabile Gounelle, 1909

References

Elaphidiini